Olagoke Olabisi (AKA Lagoke Labisi) is an author, editor, educator, mentor, inventor, and entrepreneur. A Nigerian–American chemical engineer, Olagoke is the Chief Consultant and CEO of Infra-Tech consulting LLC, an energy consulting company focused on corrosion and materials engineering. He has 9 patents and a total of 97 publications including Fugacity and Vapor Pressure of Non-Polar Liquids at Low Temperatures, Thermoplastics Beyond the Year 2000: A Paradigm, and Handbook of Thermoplastics, 2nd Edition. He has been involved in academia and industry in the United States, Nigeria, Saudi Arabia, and Kuwait. He is a mentor to students and young professionals.

Early life and education
Born in Osogbo, Osun State, Nigeria on 25 September 1943, Olabisi had his secondary school education at Ibadan Boys' High School Oyo State and proceeded to Government College, Ibadan, where he completed his advanced high school education in 1964. He was a 1965 recipient of a scholarship award from the African Scholarship Program of American Universities (ASPAU) administered by Africa-America Institute (AAI), to study Chemical Engineering at Purdue University, Indiana. In 1969, he graduated with two degrees: one in chemical engineering and the other in industrial management. He was the recipient of The John Clarence Lottes Memorial Award as the best senior student on the basis of scholastic ability in chemical engineering  and his senior project was published.

Olabisi proceeded to the University of California, Berkeley where he earned MS degree in chemical engineering in 1971 with a thesis entitled "Secondary and Primary Normal Stresses, Hole Error, and Reservoir Edge Effects in Cone-and-Plate Flow of Polymer Solutions", whose results were published in an article with the same title. He furthered his studies and earned a PhD degree in macromolecular science and engineering at Case-Western Reserve University in 1973, with a dissertation entitled Pressure-volume-temperature properties of amorphous and crystallizable polymers and oligomers (which is cited in an associated journal article) under the tutelage of Robert Simha. In 1980, he earned an MS degree in engineering management at the New Jersey Institute of Technology through a part-time self-development program.

Career
Olabisi received a PhD degree just prior to the 1973 oil crisis which dramatically drove up the price of crude oil, petrochemicals, polymer, and plastics. An immediate plastics industry response to the crisis was to focus on plastics material conservation. There arose the need for plastics processes to employ less than a full density of plastics material in producing light-weight automotive and other plastics material articles having structural properties matching or exceeding those of solid (full density) plastics articles. While employed at the R&D Department of Union Carbide Corporation Olabisi earned eight patents that addressed the conservation issue. The two key process patents are: Process for the molding of plastics structural web and the resulting articles  and Structural foam molding process.

The conservation activity of developing new plastics materials through blending of two or more structurally different homopolymers, copolymers, terpolymers and other plastics, resulted in Olabisi's publications on Polyblends, Polymer Compatibilization: Blends of Polyarylethers with Styrenic Interpolymers  and others. As part of the industry-university interaction with Polytechnic Institute of New York, Olabisi was appointed adjunct professor of Chemical Engineering to teach a graduate-level course based on his book, Polymer-Polymer Miscibility that provided some basis for research projects on plastics materials conservation.

Following the impact of 1973 oil crisis, the Nigerian National Petroleum Corporation (NNPC) was established (1977) and, in the same year, Nigeria joined OPEC as the 11th member country. A fully-fledged petrochemical complex was in operation in Nigeria in the early 1980s when Olabisi was appointed a professor of Chemical Engineering, University of Lagos. The need for teaching, research, and public service in petrochemicals, plastics, and polymer materials engineering was high in the country. Olabisi initiated courses and research for a PhD program in petrochemicals. Through his adjunct professorship and other linkages with the University of Akron and Case Western Reserve university, he was able to secure opportunities for some students to earn postgraduate fellowships to pursue PhD in the two universities. These graduates eventually became professors, executives of government parastatals, or captains of industry.

In response to the global events, the new Lagos State University (LASU), established in 1985, decided on having a comprehensive engineering program and Olabisi was appointed the Foundation Dean of the Faculty of Engineering, Technology, and Environmental Sciences (FETES) in 1987. Aside from establishing the traditional departments, Olabisi established a department of polymer technology, the first such department in any Nigeria university. An award of the Association of Commonwealth Universities (ACU) Senior Traveling Fellowship enabled him to establish a fruitful linkage with the University of Adelaide resulting in LASU receiving an equipment donation worth more than a million dollars in 1988.

By 1989, the devaluation of the Naira forced an economic quandary on Nigeria. Olabisi was appointed the managing director, UNILAG Consult, University of Lagos. In response to the economic climate, he organized the National Workshop on Economic Recovery Program. He also initiated activities on Baseline Ecological Studies of the Niger Delta Basin; Soil Maps of Nigeria; and assisting the government's ongoing Delivery of Technical Aid to Equatorial Guinea. His activities at UNILAG Consult earned Olabisi a special award for dynamic, innovative, and result-oriented leadership in August 1990. Olabisi was the Founder and CEO of the African Biographical Centre LTD, Publisher of Who's Who in Nigerian Universities and Research Institutes.

Prior to 1990, gel-casting of ceramic powders was a continuing cooperative research program. between Allied-Signal Aerospace Company and Oak Ridge National Laboratory (ORNL). As a visiting consultant with the Oak Ridge National Laboratory during the summer of 1990, Olabisi had an invention disclosure (ESID No. 917-X) relating to the program, which involved the use of a variety of water-soluble monomers. The results were subsequently subsumed in the patent entitled Method for molding ceramic powders using a water-based gel casting.
  
In spite of the 1973 oil crisis and the 1979 oil crisis, the petrochemicals organizations in the OPEC countries, including SABIC, still depended on licensing third-party process technologies to fulfil their resin needs. One of the ways SABIC sought to reduce or eliminate the dependence was to initiate a research program at the Research Institute, King Fahd University of Petroleum and Minerals KFUPM, Dhahran, Saudi Arabia. In 1990, Olabisi was appointed a professor and Senior Research Engineer at KFUPM. His activities in the SABIC-sponsored program resulted in a joint patent entitled Catalyst and process for ethylene oligomerization. His subsequent activities as a Consulting Engineering Specialist at Saudi Aramco earned Olabisi a 2003 Saudi Aramco Certificate of Recognition for Outstanding Achievements in Engineering & Operations Services.  He had a number of publications exemplified by some key articles.

The United States Department of Transportation (DOT) Pipeline & Hazardous Materials Safety Administration (PHMSA) sponsored a research project DTPH56-08-T-000012 at Corrpro (a subsidiary of Aegion). In 2007, Olabisi was appointed Director, Internal Corrosion Engineering, as well as the Principal Investigator of the PHMSA project, the report of which made an impact on the external corrosion direct assessment (ECDA) process. He also became the lead developer of the Pipeline Corrosion Integrity Management (PCIM) Course  for NACE International. The other Corrpro Oil and Gas corrosion projects he managed were on behalf of several clients including ENI US Operating Co., Inc. North Slope Alaska; Pioneer Natural Resources Alaska, Inc. North Slope Alaska; Gulf South Pipeline Company LP; Boardwalk Pipeline Partners, LP; SCANA Transmission Pipelines; Trunkline LNG Company, LLC; Cheniere Energy; and Murphy Exploration & Production Company. His contributions to the Internal Corrosion Monitoring Services (ICMS) Project of Kuwait Oil Company included a publication on Black Powder in Export Gas Lines as well as others. He continues to consult in his capacity as the Chief Consultant, Infra-Tech Consulting LLC, Olabisi remains a member of international professional and engineering organizations.

Honors and awards
1966 Member of Omega Chi Epsilon Honor Society
1966 Member of Tau Beta Pi Honor Society,
1969 Member of Sigma Xi Honor Society, 
1969 The John Clarence Lottes Memorial Award as the best senior student on the basis of scholastic ability, Purdue University, Chemical Engineering Department
1990 Merit Award for Excellence in the Field of Engineering and Technology, Ministry of Science and Technology, Nigeria
1990 Special Award for Dynamic, Innovative, and Result-Oriented Leadership, Unilag Consult University of Lagos   
1991 Fellow of the Nigerian Society of Chemical Engineers
1996 SABIC Special Award for "New concepts & Best Idea for Using Plastic Material in New Application"
1999 Fellow of the Nigerian Society of Engineers
2001 Saudi Aramco Outstanding Achievement Award in Engineering & Operations Services. 
2007 Outstanding Achievement Award by US Chapter of Nigerian Society of Chemical Engineers.
2022 Distinguished Leadership Award for Excellent Leadership, Extraordinary Commitment & Years of Loyal Service by Faculty of Engineering Lagos State University.
2022 Fellow of the Nigerian Academy of Engineering.

Patents and publications
Olabisi is an author, editor, educator, mentor,inventor, and entrepreneur; he has 9 patents and a total of 97 publications. on different topics in the fields of Chemical Engineering, Materials Engineering, Corrosion, Petrochemicals, Oil and Gas.

Personal life
Olagoke Olabisi resides with his wife, Juliet Olabisi, in Sugar Land, Texas.

References

1943 births
Living people
American people of Nigerian descent
American people of Yoruba descent
People from Sugar Land, Texas
American inventors
Nigerian inventors
Nigerian emigrants to the United States
Nigerian engineers
Yoruba engineers
Yoruba scientists
Yoruba academics
American chemical engineers
20th-century American engineers
21st-century American engineers
Government College, Ibadan alumni
Purdue University alumni
University of California, Berkeley alumni
Nigerian expatriate academics in the United States
Academic staff of the University of Lagos
Academic staff of Lagos State University
Academic staff of King Fahd University of Petroleum and Minerals